Eric Shade can refer to:

 Eric Shade (cricketer) (born 1943), Australian cricketer
 Eric Shade (footballer) (1912–1984), Australian rules footballer